Lundamo is a village in the municipality of Melhus in Trøndelag county, Norway. It is located along the Gaula River between the villages of Hovin and Ler.

Lundamo Station is located in the village along the Dovre Line, but it is now in use only for local traffic. The European route E6 highway also runs through the village.  The Gaula River runs through Lundamo and in 2005 it was selected the best river for salmon-fishing in Norway. Lundamo was the administrative center of the former municipality of Horg.  It is also the location of the Horg Church.

References

Melhus
Villages in Trøndelag